The 1932–33 Boston Bruins season was the Bruins' ninth season in the NHL. The team won the division to qualify for the playoffs. The Bruins lost in the semi-finals to the Toronto Maple Leafs.

Offseason

Regular season

Final standings

Record vs. opponents

Schedule and results

Playoffs
Under the playoff format of the era, the two divisional champions met in a best-of-five semifinal.  Boston, the champions of the American Division, lost to the Toronto Maple Leafs (Canadian Division  champions) in five games.  The series is famous for the fifth game, played at Maple Leaf Gardens, which took six overtime periods to decide a winner.  The game's only goal was scored Toronto's Ken Doraty at 4:46 of the sixth overtime.  At the time it was the longest game ever played in NHL history and it remains the longest game ever played by either the Bruins or the Maple Leafs.

Player statistics

Regular season
Scoring

Goaltending

Playoffs
Scoring

Goaltending

Awards and records

Transactions

See also
1932–33 NHL season

References

Boston Bruins seasons
Boston
Boston
Boston Bruins
Boston Bruins
1930s in Boston